Oncideres voetii is a species of beetle in the family Cerambycidae. It was described by James Thomson in 1868. It is known from Guyana and French Guiana.

References

voetii
Beetles described in 1868